TechCrunch is an American online newspaper focusing on high tech and startup companies. It was founded in June 2005 by Archimedes Ventures, led by partners Michael Arrington and Keith Teare. 

In 2010, AOL acquired the company for approximately $25 million. Following the 2015 acquisition of AOL and Yahoo by Verizon, the site was owned by Verizon Media from 2015 through 2021. In 2021 Verizon sold its media assets, including AOL, Yahoo, and TechCrunch, to the private equity firm Apollo Global Management, and Apollo integrated them into a new entity called Yahoo! Inc..

In addition to its news reporting, TechCrunch is also known for its Disrupt conference, an annual technology event hosted in several cities across United States, Europe, and China.

History
TechCrunch was founded in June 2005 by Archimedes Ventures, led by partners Michael Arrington and Keith Teare. 

In 2010, AOL acquired the company for approximately $25 million. 

As of 2013, TechCrunch was available in English, Chinese (managed by Chinese tech news company, TechNode), and Japanese. TechCrunch France was folded into the main TechCrunch.com site in October 2012.  Boudless (formerly Verizon Media Japan), the Japanese subsidiary of the TechCrunch's parent company, closed TechCrunch Japan in May 2022 according to its "global strategy".

Following the acquisition of AOL and Yahoo by Verizon, TechCrunch was owned by Verizon Media from 2015 through 2021.

In August 2020, COO of TechCrunch, Ned Desmond, stepped down after 8 years in the company. He announced that he would join venture capital firm, SOSV in December 2020 as senior operating partner. His former role at TechCrunch was replaced by Matthew Panzarino, former editor-in-chief, and Joey Hinson, director of business operations.

In 2021 Verizon sold its media assets, including AOL, Yahoo, and TechCrunch, to the private equity firm Apollo Global Management, and Apollo integrated them into a new entity called Yahoo.

Events

TechCrunch Disrupt 
TechCrunch hosts an annual tech conference, TechCrunch Disrupt, in several cities in the United States and Europe.

In 2014, TechCrunch Disrupt was featured in an arc of the HBO series Silicon Valley. The characters' startup "Pied Piper" participates on a startup battle at TechCrunch Disrupt.

Startup Battlefield
Startup Battlefield is a startup competition. Monetary awards are presented at the TechCrunch Disrupt conferences. Notable startups that have been involved in the competition include DropBox, Intuit Mint, Yammer, and CrateDB.

Former features

Crunchbase 
From 2007 to 2015, TechCrunch operated Crunchbase, a website and online encyclopedia of information on startups, key people, funds, funding rounds, and events. In 2015, Crunchbase spun out of TechCrunch to become a private entity, and is no longer a part of TechCrunch.

Crunchies
From 2007 to 2017, TechCrunch sponsored the annual Crunchies award ceremony to award startups, internet and technology innovations. At the first award ceremony in 2007, Facebook won the award for best startup. Due to controversy surrounding the awards' hosts, TechCrunch announced in 2017 that it would end the Crunchies.

Controversies
The company was criticized for allowing developers to present the Titstare application, created by participants in a hackathon at TechCrunch Disrupt 2013. The application allows users to "stare at tits".

In 2011, the site's editors and writers were criticized for possible ethics violations. These included claims that Arrington's investments in certain firms which the site had covered created a conflict of interest. The controversy that ensued eventually led to Arrington's departure, and other writers, including Paul Carr and Sarah Lacy, followed suit.

References

External links

 

Yahoo!
Online publishing companies of the United States
Internet properties established in 2005
Technology blogs
Technology conferences
American technology news websites
Webby Award winners
Web-related conferences
2005 establishments in the United States
2010 mergers and acquisitions